IndustryWeek (IW) is an American monthly trade publication founded in 1882. It focuses largely on mechanical engineering and manufacturing news.

Content
IndustryWeek is a trade publication and website owned by Endeavor Business Media. It is a business-to-business (B2B) service that produces print, e-media, research, and in-person products. Its editorial offices are in Cleveland, Ohio, and its editor-in-chief is Robert Schoenberger.

IndustryWeek provides manufacturing executives with key insights on and analysis of trends, news, operational knowledge, and research, as well as facilitating peer-to-peer conversation among the global manufacturing management community.

History
The magazine was founded as Iron Review in 1882; it became Iron Trade Review in 1888; and Steel, "The Metalworking Management Weekly" in 1930. In January 1970, the publication changed its name and focus again, this time to IndustryWeek. Between 1970 and 2000, its tagline and publication frequency changed several times, finally settling to a monthly format in 2001. Over 125 years of publishing history and throughout its different incarnations, IndustryWeek has been a fixture in the U.S. manufacturing community.

Programs
IW Best Plants program: Founded in 1989, Best Plants is a rigorous benchmarking competition for manufacturing facilities in North America.

IW 50 Best Manufacturing Companies: Founded in 2002, the formula for determining this list factors in revenue growth and profit margin over the past three years, with the most recent year results weighted most heavily. Three-year performance in four other financial ratios; return on equity, return on assets, asset turnover, and inventory turns are also considered.

IW 1000 and IW 500: Independent rankings of the largest manufacturing companies, by revenues. The IW 1000 is a global ranking, and the IW 500 is a US ranking.

IW Technology and Innovation Awards: A program, founded in 1993, for recognizing advancements in manufacturing technology.

References

 BPA Worldwide

External links
 Official website

Business magazines published in the United States
Monthly magazines published in the United States
Magazines established in 1970
Magazines published in Cleveland